Schoonmaker Stone House and Farm is a historic home and farm complex located at Rochester in Ulster County, New York.  The property includes the house, a small shed (ca. 1880), privy (ca. 1880), and two barns.  The house is a late 18th-century or early 19th-century, two-story gable-end stone house built in a simple Adamesque style.

It was listed on the National Register of Historic Places in 1997.

References

Houses on the National Register of Historic Places in New York (state)
Federal architecture in New York (state)
Houses completed in 1820
Houses in Ulster County, New York
National Register of Historic Places in Ulster County, New York